Joseph W. Gilliam Sr. (c. 1923 – November 14, 2012) was an American football player and coach.

Gilliam was born in Steubenville, Ohio, and began his collegiate playing career at Indiana University before transferring to West Virginia State University, where he was an All-American at quarterback.

Gilliam was head football and basketball coach at Oliver High School in Winchester, Kentucky from 1952 to 1954, winning a state championship in football in 1954.

Gilliam joined coach John Merritt's coaching staff at Jackson State University in 1955 and left in 1957 to become head coach at Kentucky State University. After compiling a record of 2–13–1 at Kentucky State, he coached briefly at the high school level before returning to Merritt's staff at Jackson State.  He followed Merritt to Tennessee State University, where, as defensive coordinator, he helped the Tigers to four undefeated seasons and seven black college football national championships in a 20-year span.

Gilliam served as head coach at Tennessee State from 1989 to 1992, earning Ohio Valley Conference Coach Of The Year honors in 1990.

Gilliam is father of former Pittsburgh Steelers quarterback Joe Gilliam, and the grandfather of R&B singer Joi.  Gilliam was inducted into the Tennessee Sports Hall Of Fame in 2007.  At the time of his death, Gilliam was residing in Nashville.

Head coaching record

College

References

1920s births
2012 deaths
American football quarterbacks
Jackson State Tigers football coaches
Kentucky State Thorobreds football coaches
Tennessee State Tigers football coaches
West Virginia State Yellow Jackets football players
High school basketball coaches in Kentucky
High school football coaches in Kentucky
Indiana University alumni
Sportspeople from Steubenville, Ohio
Players of American football from Ohio
African-American coaches of American football
African-American players of American football
20th-century African-American sportspeople
21st-century African-American sportspeople